Baghavat is a 1982 Hindi language film starring Dharmendra,  Hema Malini, Reena Roy, Amjad Khan and music composed by Laxmikant-Pyarelal. The film is directed by Ramanand Sagar.  It became a "hit" at the box office.

Cast 
 Dharmendra as Rajkumar Amar Singh
 Hema Malini as Rajkumari Padmavati Singh
 Reena Roy as Chhanno
 Amjad Khan as Durjan Singh / Vikram Singh (Double Role) 
 Sujit Kumar as Sarju
 Padma Chavan as Maharani 
 Urmila Bhatt as Amar's Foster Mother
 B. M. Vyas as Mahamantri
 D. K. Sapru as Maharaj

Soundtrack 
Music by Laxmikant–Pyarelal. Lyrics by Anand Bakshi

References

External links 

1982 films
1980s Hindi-language films
Indian epic films
Films scored by Laxmikant–Pyarelal
Films directed by Ramanand Sagar